Good Man may refer to:

Film and television
 The Good Man (film), a 2012 Irish film
 "The Good Man" (Fear the Walking Dead), a television episode
 "Good Man" (Girls), a television episode

Music
 Good Man (album), a 2018 album by Ne-yo
 "Good Man" (song), a song on the album
 "Good Man", a 2002 song by India.Arie from Voyage to India
 "Good Man", a 2009 song by Heavy Trash from Midnight Soul Serenade
 "Good Man", a 2014 song by Nikki Lane from All or Nothin'
 "Good Man", a 2017 song by DJ Khaled from Grateful

Military
Hans Münch, military officer, also known as the Good man of Auschwitz.

See also
 A Good Man (disambiguation)
 Goodman (disambiguation)